Crometeo is a non-profit association of Croatian amateur meteorologists. It was founded in November 2005 and its headquarters are in Zagreb, Croatia. Crometeo monitors and forecasts weather, perusing a network of automatic weather stations in Croatia. The data from the stations is made available on-line. Crometeo also maintains a web portal and a forum on meteorology, and works to popularise meteorology in Croatia. Presided by Kristijan Božarov, aside from Croatian members, Crometeo has associates from other, mainly neighbouring countries.

In recent years, the association gained popularity in Croatian media for its weather forecasts and articles relating to weather, climate, meteorology and environment.

External links
  

Meteorological societies
Science and technology in Croatia
Organizations established in 2005
2005 establishments in Croatia